Jean Rech (1931 - December 2017) was a French aerodynamicist, and the chief aerodynamicist for Concorde, on the French division.

Early life
He attended École nationale supérieure de l'aéronautique et de l'espace (known as Supaéro).

Career

Aérospatiale
He worked for Sud Aviation and Aérospatiale on Concorde, and then on its ATR division (with Aeritalia of Italy).

Personal life
He died aged 86 in December 2017.

Publications
 Concorde aerodynamics and associated systems development (with Clive Leyman),

References

1931 births
2017 deaths
Aerodynamicists
Aérospatiale
Concorde
French aerospace engineers
Sud Aviation
Supaéro alumni